Brookside, Wisconsin may refer to the following places in Wisconsin:
Brookside, Adams County, Wisconsin, an unincorporated community
Brookside, Oconto County, Wisconsin, an unincorporated community